Kristina Leonidovna Reztsova (born 27 April 1996) is a Russian biathlete. At the 2022 Winter Olympics, representing the Russia Olympic Committee, she won a bronze medal as part of the mixed relay team and a silver medal as part of the women's relay team.

She started competing in the World Cup in the 2019–20 season, but the best she achieved was an 18th position in one of the races. Reztsova missed the 2020–21 season due to the birth of her daughter. After she returned to competitions, in the 2021–22 season, Reztsova achieved her first top-10 finish in an individual World Cup race, and eventually four podium finishes. She qualified for the 2022 Winter Olympics, the first Olympics in her career.

Reztsova is the second daughter of Anfisa Reztsova, an Olympic champion in cross-country skiing and biathlon. She was training separately from the Russian team, to be able to take care of her daughter, and on occasion criticized the Russian Biathlon Federation, something her mother was also known for.

Her older sister is Daria Virolaynen.

Biathlon results
All results are sourced from the International Biathlon Union.

Olympic Games
2 medals (1 silver, 1 bronze)

Biathlon World Cup

References

External links

1996 births
Living people
Russian female biathletes
Biathletes at the 2022 Winter Olympics
Olympic biathletes of Russia
Medalists at the 2022 Winter Olympics
Olympic medalists in biathlon
Olympic silver medalists for the Russian Olympic Committee athletes
Olympic bronze medalists for the Russian Olympic Committee athletes
Sportspeople from Moscow